Hana Skalníková  ( Klapalová; ; born 29 March 1982) is a Czech beach volleyball player. As of 2012, she plays with Lenka Háječková. They qualified for and participated at the 2012 Summer Olympics in London.

References 

1982 births
Czech beach volleyball players
Living people
Beach volleyball players at the 2012 Summer Olympics
Olympic beach volleyball players of the Czech Republic
Sportspeople from Brno
Women's beach volleyball players